A list of animated feature films released in the 1940s.

1940s
 
Lists of 1940s films by genre
1940s decade overviews